is a Japanese anime and film director. He made his full directorial debut in 2004 with the anime adaptation of Ninja Nonsense. In 2019, he directed the anime adaptation of Demon Slayer: Kimetsu no Yaiba, as well as its film, Demon Slayer: Kimetsu no Yaiba – The Movie: Mugen Train in 2020, which has earned numerous awards.

Works

TV series
 X (2002–2003) (episode director)
  (2004) (director)
  (2007–2012) (director)
  (2016–2017) (director)
  (2019–present) (director)

Films
  (2020) (director)

Video games
  (2006) (animation part director, character designer, scenarist, cinematographer, animation director, opening animator)

Awards and nominations

References

External links
 

Anime directors
Crunchyroll Anime Awards winners
Japanese film directors
Japanese television directors
Japanese video game directors
Living people
Year of birth missing (living people)